Cristian Jafeth Noriega Santizo (born 20 March 1987) is a Guatemalan professional football defender.

Club career
Noriega came through the youth ranks at Municipal to make his debut in 2007.

International career
Noriega made his debut for the senior Guatemala national football team in a February 2008 friendly match against Argentina, but the game was not official by FIFA, so, his first official one came against Panama in a June 2008 friendly. He has made 14 appearances at the start of January 2010, including 3 qualifying matches for the 2010 FIFA World Cup.

External links
 Player profile - CSD Municipal

References

1987 births
Living people
Guatemalan footballers
Guatemala international footballers
C.S.D. Municipal players
2009 UNCAF Nations Cup players
2011 CONCACAF Gold Cup players
2013 Copa Centroamericana players
Association football defenders